Krumhermsdorf is a railway station in the village of Krumhermsdorf, a part of Neustadt in Sachsen, Saxony, Germany. The station lies on the Bautzen–Bad Schandau railway.

The station is served by DB Regio Südost. This service connects Pirna and Sebnitz via Neustadt in Sachsen.

References

External links
Krumhermsdorf station at Sebnitztalbahn 
Krumhermsdorf station at www.verkerhsmittelvergleich.de 

Railway stations in Saxony
Neustadt in Sachsen
Railway stations in Germany opened in 1877